The DS 9 is an executive car introduced in 2020 by DS. The DS 9 is the company's first vehicle to be marketed to both Europe and Asia but assembled solely in China.

Presentation 
Originally, the DS 9 (internal code X83) was to be unveiled in April 2019 at Auto Shanghai, but its presentation was postponed for the first time in November for Auto Guangzhou in China, then a second time until March 2020. 

Following the end of the Changan PSA Automobiles (CAPSA) joint venture of PSA and Changan Automobile, Baoneng Group which took over the Shenzhen plant where Chinese DS are built, signed an agreement to produce DS, including the next DS 9 in Shenzhen. On 20 February 2020, DS announced the imminent presentation of a new model. 

The DS 9 was unveiled to the press on 27 February 2020, and was due to make its first public appearance at the 90th edition of the Geneva Motor Show on 3 March 2020. The Swiss show, however, was cancelled at the last moment due to the COVID-19 pandemic. Unlike the DS 7 Crossback, which is produced both in France and in China, the DS 9 is assembled only in China by Baoneng's Shenzhen factory.

Technical characteristics
The DS 9 is based on the EMP2 modular technical platform of Groupe PSA. Its dashboard is largely inspired by that of the DS 7 Crossback.

Engines
The DS sedan will be offered only in turbo gasoline 1.6 & eTense Hybrid (PHEV) version, with the 1.6 turbo petrol engine and an electric motor. The combined system output here in the DS 9 sedan will be . The 225 PS variant will be joined later by  FWD and  AWD eTense variants.

References 

DS vehicles
Front-wheel-drive vehicles
Mid-size cars
Cars introduced in 2020
Euro NCAP large family cars
Plug-in hybrid vehicles
Partial zero-emissions vehicles
Hybrid electric cars
All-wheel-drive vehicles
2020s cars